This article is about the list of Grupo Desportivo Interclube basketball players. Grupo Desportivo Interclube is an Angolan basketball club from Luanda, Angola and plays their home games at Pavilhão 28 de Fevereiro in Luanda.  The club was established in 1976.

2011–2018
G.D. Interclube men's basketball players 2011–2018

References

G.D. Interclube men's basketball players